The United Nations Institute for Disarmament Research (UNIDIR) was established in 1980 by the United Nations General Assembly to inform States and the global community on questions of international security, and to assist with disarmament efforts so as to facilitate progress toward greater security and economic and social development for all.

Recognising the need for objective, empirical and comprehensive research on disarmament and security, the General Assembly specified that UNIDIR would be an autonomous entity within the United Nations structure, so that its work could be conducted in scientific independence.

Background 

Through its research projects, publications, small meetings and expert networks, UNIDIR promotes creative thinking and dialogue on the disarmament and security challenges of today and of tomorrow.

UNIDIR explores both current and future security issues, examining topics as varied as tactical nuclear weapons, refugee security, computer warfare, regional confidence-building measures, and small arms.

Working with researchers, diplomats, government officials, non-governmental organisations and other institutions, UNIDIR acts as a bridge between the research community and United Nations Member States. UNIDIR's work is funded by contributions from governments and donor foundations.

UNIDIR is based in Geneva, the primary centre for security and disarmament negotiations, home of the Conference on Disarmament, and global focal point for humanitarian concerns such as human rights, refugees, migration, health and labour issues.

Research areas 

In 2018, the Board of Trustees endorsed the organisation's following research agenda for 2018–2020:

Weapons of Mass Destruction and Other Strategic Weapons — Reducing the risk of use of nuclear weapons; compliance and enforcement approaches and lessons; promoting habits of cooperation in WMD regimes; and space security and sustainability.
Conventional Arms — Urbanisation of violence: adopting arms control to new environments; weapons and ammunition management: supporting country approaches; and arms control in prevention and peacemaking.
New Weapon Technologies — Preventing, deterring, and responding to malicious cyber attacks, including the role of the private sector; and understanding the implications of increasing autonomy.
Gender and Disarmament — Promoting dialogue and knowledge sharing to advance gender-responsive disarmament; and developing tools to apply gender perspectives in disarmament frameworks.
Middle East Weapons of Mass Destruction Free Zone — Filling an important research gap related to how the issue of the ME WMDFZ has evolved over time, including lessons for current and future prospects.

Mandate 
UNIDIR works on the basis of the provisions of the Final Document of the First Special Session of the UN General Assembly Devoted to Disarmament and also takes into account relevant General Assembly recommendations. The work programme is reviewed annually and is subject to approval by the UN Secretary-General's Advisory Board on Disarmament Matters, which also functions as UNIDIR's Board of Trustees. The Director reports yearly to the General Assembly on the activities of the institute.

UNIDIR's mandate is as follows:

The work of the Institute shall aim at:

(a) Providing the international community with more diversified and complete data on problems relating to international security, the armaments race and disarmament in all fields, particularly in the nuclear field, so as to facilitate progress, through negotiations, towards greater security for all States and towards the economic and social development of all peoples;
(b) Promoting informed participation by all States in disarmament efforts;
(c) Assisting ongoing negotiations on disarmament and continuing efforts to ensure greater international security at a progressively lower level of armaments, particularly nuclear armaments, by means of objective and factual studies and analyses;
(d) Carrying out more in-depth, forward-looking and long-term research on disarmament, so as to provide a general insight to the problems involved and stimulating new initiatives for new negotiations.

The Mandate is from Article II, Paragraph 2 of the institute's Statute, which may be found here.

Management 
All inner workings and research done by UNIDIR is supervised by a Board of Trustees and the Director. The Board also serves as the Secretary-General's Advisory Board on Disarmament Matters. Each member must be knowledgeable in security, arms control and disarmament. Each member is elected by the Secretary General to serve a two-year term.

Director 
In February 2021, Robin Geiss was appointed as the Director of UNIDIR, succeeding Irish disarmament expert Renata Dwan. Geiss formerly served as the Director of the Glasgow Centre for International Law and Security at the University of Glasgow and as the Swiss Chair of International Humanitarian Law with the Geneva Academy of International Humanitarian Law and Human Rights.

Board Members 
 the members of the Board of Trustees were:

H.E. Ms. Semla Ashipala-Musavyi (Namibia) — Chair of the Board of Trustees; Ambassador, Permanent Secretary, Ministry of International Relations and Cooperation of Manimibia, Windhoek
Mr. Corentin Brustlein (France) — Research Fellow, Security Studies Center, Institut Francais Relations Internationales, Paris
Ms. Lucia Dammert (Peru) — Associate Professor, Universidad de Santiago de Chile, Santiago
Mr. Lewis A Dunn (United States) — Former US Ambassador to the Review Conference of the Parties to the Treaty on the Non-Proliferation of Nuclear Weapons, Virginia, United States of America
H.E. Mr. Fu Cong (China) — Ambassador, Director-General, Department of Arms Control, Ministry of Foreign Affairs of China, Beijing
Ms. Arminka Helic (United Kingdom) — Member, House of Lords of the United Kingdom, London
Mr. Anton Khlopkov (Russian Federation) — Director, Center for Energy and Security Studies, Moscow
H.E. Mr. Amandeep Gill (India) — on sabbatical from the Advisory Board
Ms. Merel Noorman (Netherlands) — Assistant Professor, Tilburg University, Tilburg, Netherlands
H.E. Ms. Enkhtsetseg Ochir (Mongolia) — Ambassador of Mongolia to Sweden, Stockholm
Mr. Abiodun Williams (Sierra Leone) — Director, Institute for Global Leadership, Professor of the Practice of International Politics, The Fletcher School of Law and Diplomacy, Tufts University, Medford, United States of America
H.E. Mr. Motaz Zahran (Egypt) — Ambassador, Deputy Assistant Foreign Minister for Cabinet Affairs, Cairo
Dr. Robin Geiss (Germany) — Ex officio member

List of Directors

See also 
Disarmament as Humanitarian Action
International Atomic Energy Agency
Nuclear Non-Proliferation Treaty
United Nations Office for Disarmament Affairs
UN System
Insecurity Insight

References

External links 
UNIDIR Homepage

Nuclear weapons policy
United Nations Development Group
Research institutes in the United Nations System
United Nations organizations based in Geneva